Khrystyne Kamil Haje (born December 21, 1968) is an American actress. She is known for her role as Simone Foster in the sitcom series Head of the Class. After the series ended in 1991, she continued acting in both television and films. Haje was named as one of the "50 Most Beautiful People" in People magazine's first edition of that list in 1990.

Career
Haje began her career at age 14 as a fashion model while attending North Hollywood High School. Her acting career started at 17 in the television movie Crime of Innocence.

After appearing in several other television roles, including an appearance in the movie Bates Motel, Haje landed the role of sensitive poet Simone Foster on Head of the Class. After the series ended in 1991, she continued acting in both television and films. She was named as one of the "50 Most Beautiful People" in People Magazines first edition of that list in 1990.

That same year, Haje won a Daytime Emmy Award for Outstanding Special Class Program for hosting the special Spaceship Earth: Our Global Environment. In 1995, Haje voiced the character of Rebecca Fallbrook in an episode of Batman: The Animated Series.

In the late 1990s, she began working in theatre productions and appearing less in television productions.

In 2001, People Magazine reported that Haje was "quarter owner of a Silicon Valley company" worth $500 million. Haje explained, "I was really lucky and made a smart move."

Personal life
Haje was born in Santa Clara, California and has four brothers. Her parents are of Lebanese and Czech origin. Haje is a founding board member of the Earth Communication Office (ECO), which helps to protect ecosystems. 

She appeared on the March 23, 2012 episode of the Rachael Ray Show to have her hair cut as part of National Donate Your Hair Day (April 27) for women with cancer.

In 2015, Haje was diagnosed with stage IV breast cancer, three years after being successfully treated for invasive lobular breast cancer. Although doctors estimated she had only two years to live, a medical trial called the SM-88 treatment (consisting of daily pills and injections) was successful, leaving her with no evidence of cancer within two years. She said, "I'm so lucky....I found this treatment, and I responded to it. And I don't suffer."

FilmographyFilmTelevision'''

Awards and nominations
1992: Daytime Emmy Award for Outstanding Special Class Program; Spaceship Earth: Our Global Environment (shared with Kirk Bergstrom and Kit Thomas)

Young Artist Awards nominations:
1987: Exceptional Performance By a Young Actress in a New Television, Comedy or Drama Series, Head of the Class 
1988: Exceptional Performance by a Young Actress in a Television Comedy Series, Head of the Class 
1989: Best Young Actress – Starring in a Television Comedy Series, Head of the Class''

References

External links

Official Website

1968 births
Living people
American people of Lebanese descent
American people of Czech descent
20th-century American actresses
21st-century American actresses
Actresses from the San Francisco Bay Area
American child actresses
American film actresses
American stage actresses
American television actresses
People from Santa Clara, California
North Hollywood High School alumni
United Service Organizations entertainers